Oncophorus is a genus of mosses belonging to the family Dicranaceae.

The genus has almost cosmopolitan distribution.

There are 17 species, including:
 Oncophorus conglomeratus Brid. 
 Oncophorus crenulatus (Mitt.) Braithw.
 Oncophorus virens  (Hedw.)

References

Dicranales
Moss genera